Hoda Muthana (born October 28, 1994) is a U.S.-born Yemeni woman who emigrated from the United States to Syria to join ISIS in November 2014. She surrendered in January 2019 to coalition forces fighting ISIS in Syria and has been denied access back to the United States after a U.S. court ruling annulled her American citizenship. When she was born, her father was a Yemeni diplomat, making her ineligible for American citizenship by birth.

Early life
Muthana was born in Hackensack, New Jersey on October 28, 1994. Her father was a Yemeni diplomat, although it is disputed whether he was a diplomat at the time of her birth or whether he resigned months before. Muthana was raised in Hoover, Alabama and attended Hoover High School before leaving the United States to join ISIS in November 2014 using funds that her parents had provided for her college tuition.

Time in ISIS

In December 2014, Muthana married Suhan Rahman, an Australian jihadist who went by the name Abu Jihad Al-Australi. On Twitter, she advocated for terror attacks against civilians in the United States and encouraged more residents to travel to ISIS-controlled territory and support the caliphate. The Guardian reported that Muthana claimed that her Twitter account was hacked by others. In an interview with ABC News on February 19, 2019, when she was asked about a tweet in which she called for the murder of Americans at Veterans and Memorial Day parades, Muthana replied "I can't even believe I thought of that."

Muthana's husband, Rahman, was killed in Syria in March 2015. She then married a Tunisian fighter and gave birth to a son. Muthana stated that she began to question her allegiance to the caliphate around this time. Her second husband was killed fighting in Mosul in 2017, and she fled from Raqqa to Mayadin to Hajin and finally to Shafa in eastern Syria. She married and divorced a third man around this time. Muthana befriended Kimberly Gwen Polman, a dual Canadian-U.S. citizen, when the jihadi enclave had shrunk to just a few square miles. Food was so scarce that they were reduced to boiling grass for nourishment. They agreed to try to escape the enclave, although Polman said that her first attempt to defect had led to her being imprisoned, tortured and raped. Muthana escaped from Shafa and surrendered to American troops on January 10, 2019. Both Muthana and Polman were placed in the Al-Hawl refugee camp in Syria. The pair have expressed their desire to return to the United States.

BuzzFeed conducted an interview with Muthana, her father, and a friend in 2015. They reported that after her father gave her a cell phone, she created a Twitter account her parents were not aware of, which eventually gained thousands of followers. The friend they interviewed said she may have been one of the only people who knew her in both real life and through Twitter. Buzzfeed respected her friend's desire to remain anonymous. She said that there was a gulf between Muthana's real world self and the more radical persona she adopted on Twitter, offering as an example that Muthana claimed she had worn modest jilbābs and abayas since eighth grade, when she had only adopted modest dress recently.

In an interview with The New York Times, Muthana described how newly arrived female sympathizers like her were made to surrender their cell phones, and confined to a locked barracks, where they were held available as potential brides for jihadi fighters.

Citizenship

In January 2016, the Obama Administration revoked Muthana's passport, and stated in a letter that she was not a birthright citizen because her father's termination of diplomatic status had not been officially documented until February 1995.

President Trump instructed Secretary of State Mike Pompeo to not allow her back into the country. Pompeo released a press statement that read: "Ms. Hoda Muthana is not a U.S. citizen and will not be admitted into the United States. She does not have any legal basis, no valid U.S. passport, no right to a passport, nor any visa to travel to the United States. We continue to strongly advise all U.S. citizens not to travel to Syria." Her lawyer, Charles Swift disputes the government's argument regarding birthright citizenship, asserting her father was discharged from his diplomatic position a month before she was born. On February 21, 2019, Muthana's father, Ahmed Ali Muthana, filed an emergency lawsuit, asking the federal government to affirm Muthana's citizenship and allow her to return to the United States.

In November 2019, a federal judge ruled that she did not have American citizenship.

In 2021, the DC Circuit Court of Appeals upheld the decision of the District Court, ruling that Muthana is not a US citizen. In 2022, the United States Supreme Court declined to hear her appeal.

Later developments 
In April 2021, her sister was arrested while allegedly attempting to join ISIS.

References

1994 births
Living people
American Islamists
People from Hackensack, New Jersey
Islamic State of Iraq and the Levant members
United States nationality law
American people of Yemeni descent
Stateless people